Ongwae is a surname, likely of Kenyan origin. Notable people with the surname include:
 James Ongwae (born 1952), Kenyan politician
 Tylor Ongwae (born 1991), Kenyan basketball player